Shastri Nagar may refer to
 Shastri Nagar, Ahmedabad, a neighborhood of Ahmedabad, India
 Shastri Nagar, Chennai, a suburb of Chennai, India
 Shastri Nagar, Delhi, a locality in Delhi, India
 Shastri Nagar, Goregaon, a neighbourhood of Mumbai, India
 Shastri Nagar, Great Nicobar, a village in Andaman and Nicobar Islands, India
 Shastri Nagar metro station, a metro station in Delhi, India